The Tour de Blida is a staged cycling race held annually in Algeria since 2013. It is rated 2.2 and is part of UCI Africa Tour.

Winners

References

Cycle races in Algeria
2013 establishments in Algeria
Recurring sporting events established in 2013
UCI Africa Tour races